Cyana amabilis is a moth of the family Erebidae. It was described by Frederic Moore in 1877. It is found on the Andamans and Nicobar Islands.

References

Cyana
Moths described in 1877